Kousar Kamali (born 21 February 1995) is an Iranian footballer who plays as a defender for Kowsar Women Football League club Sepahan SC. She has been a member of the senior Iran women's national team.

References 

1995 births
Living people
Iranian women's footballers
Iran women's international footballers
Women's association football defenders
People from Babol
Footballers at the 2010 Summer Youth Olympics
Sportspeople from Mazandaran province
21st-century Iranian women